Typification is a process of creating standard (typical) social construction based on standard assumptions. Discrimination based on typification is called typism.

See also
Ideal type
Normal type
Typology

References

External links
Typification at Sociology Index

Sociological terminology